The Ecuador women's national under-20 football team represents Ecuador in international  women's football at the age of under-20. The team plays South American Under-20 Women's Football Championship.  and its controlled by the Ecuadorian Football Federation.

Team image

Nicknames
The Ecuador women's national under-20 football team has been known or nicknamed as the La Tricolor (Three colors).

Home stadium
Uruguay plays their home matches on the Estadio George Capwell and others stadiums.

History
The Ecuador womens national under-20 football team have played their debut game on 11 May 2004 at Caracas, Venezuela against Venezuela which lost by 0–4. The team were finished Third-place in 2004 South American U-19 Women's Championship and it's the nation best performance in the tournament. The have not yet qualified into the FIFA U-20 Women's World Cup

Current squad
The following squad was named for 2022 South American Under-20 Women's Football Championship

Fixtures and results
Legend

2022

Competitive records
 Champions   Runners-up   Third place   Fourth place

FIFA U-20 Women's World Cup

South American Under-20 Women's Football Championship

References

 
Football in Ecuador
South American women's national under-20 association football teams